Living monument (are the commemorations to the victims of past war in the former Yugoslavia organized by the UDIK.

Living monument builds up in front of the Sacret Heart Cathedral in Sarajevo. Besides Sarajevo, UDIK built Living monument in other cities and towns, such as Ahmići Banja Luka Belgrade, Bijeljina, Brčko, Višegrad, Zagreb, Priboj, Prijepolje, Srebrenica, Tuzla, Foča and others.

Activities

References

External links
  The Living Monument a unique Monument to the victims of wars in Former Yugoslavia UDIK
  Kazani Osservatorio Balcani
  UDIK obilježio 23 godišnjicu stradanja civila u selu Trusina kod Konjica Vijesti
  Sjećanje na žrtve Bratunaca i Srebrenice: Bez istine nema života Radio Slobodna Evropa
  UDIK: sutra aktivistnost povodom godišnjice stradanja u logoru Luka Otisak
  Sutra u Brčko distriktu podsjećanje na zločine u logoru Luka Faktor

Politics of Yugoslavia
Anti-war works